Krishna Sudhaama is a 1943 Indian Kannada film, directed by K. Subramanyam. The film stars Bellave Narahari Shastri and S. D. Subbalakshmi. The film has a musical score by Parthasarthi Iyengar.

Cast
Bellave Narahari Shastri
S. D. Subbalakshmi

Soundtrack
The music was composed by Parthasarthi Iyengar.

References

External links
 

1943 films
1940s Kannada-language films
Indian black-and-white films